Toronto Falcons Football Club is a soccer team based in Toronto, Ontario, Canada. The team is a member of the Canadian Soccer League.

Players

Current squad

Year-by-year

References

Association football clubs established in 2022
Fal
Canadian Soccer League (1998–present) teams
2022 in Canadian soccer
2022 establishments in Ontario
Ukrainian diaspora in Canada
Etobicoke